Allan Søgaard (born 20 January 1978) is a former Danish football (soccer) player, spent his entire career playing for the Danish Superliga side AC Horsens. His normal position was as a defensive midfielder. He was known as a pacy player, with a major dedication to his team.

Søgaard played a huge part in AC Horsens' promotion to the Superliga in 2005, and kept up his importance for the team during the first Superliga season. However, due to injury, he was out of the team during entire 2007.

Honours
Danish 1st Division:
Runner-up: 2004-05 (with Horsens)

External links
 AC Horsens profile
Career statistics at Danmarks Radio

1978 births
Living people
Danish men's footballers
AC Horsens players
Danish Superliga players
People from Horsens Municipality
Association football midfielders
Middelfart Boldklub players
Sportspeople from the Central Denmark Region